The Chantecler is a breed of chicken originating in Canada. The Chantecler was developed in the early 20th century, at the Abbey of Notre-Dame du Lac in Oka, Quebec. It is extremely cold-resistant, and is suitable for both egg and meat production.

History
At the dawn of the 20th century, no breeds of chicken had been established in Canada, and Canadian farmers and poultry fanciers only had fowl of European and American derivation. This fact was noted by Brother Wilfrid Châtelain, a Trappist monk and Doctor of Agronomy, as he toured the poultry flocks of the Oka Agricultural Institute, an agricultural school at his abbey which is affiliated with the Université de Montréal. 

In 1907, the Brother set out to remedy this void and create a practical chicken that would be suited to Canada's climate and production needs. Working at the Abbey of Notre-Dame du Lac in Oka, Chantelain first combined Dark Cornishes, White Leghorns, Rhode Island Reds, White Plymouth Rocks and White Wyandottes, creating the White variant of the Chantecler. It was admitted into the American Poultry Association's Standard of Perfection in 1921.  By 1918, the breed was presented to the public. To this day, the Chantecler is one of only two breeds of poultry from Canada, and the only one known to have been created primarily by a member of a monastic order. 

At the outset, it was only intended for the breed to be white in color; white birds are preferred for commercial meat production in the West, as they produce a particularly clean-looking carcass. In the 1930s, the Partridge Chantecler was generated by crossing Partridge Wyandottes, Partridge Cochins, Dark Cornishes, and the rose comb type of Brown Leghorns to produce a chicken more adapted to free range conditions. This variant was admitted to the Standard in 1935. There has also been a Buff variety present since the 1950s, but it has never been admitted to show standards.

In 1979, the extinction of the Chantecler was publicized, with what was thought to be the last rooster of the breed dying at the University of Saskatchewan's Department of Animal and Poultry Science. However, despite the disappearance of the breed in institutional and commercial hatcheries, it was still maintained by a few small farms. In the 21st century, the breed persists, but is listed as Critical by the American Livestock Breeds Conservancy.

Characteristics

The Chantecler is a large chicken that lays respectably well and is a good meat producer. With plumage that lies tight against the body but has a good deal of fluff, and an exceptionally small cushion comb and wattles, the Chantecler is one of the most cold hardy chickens. They are gentle birds amenable to taming, but can be temperamental in confinement.

Footnotes

References
 Devis de la Poule Chantecler; Pierre Ferron 2009.
 SQPCP...Société Québécoise de la Poule Chantecler Patrimoniale (GALEP).

External links

 Chanteclers at the Canadian Farm Animal Genetic Resources Foundation

Conservation Priority Breeds of the Livestock Conservancy
Chicken breeds originating in Canada
Chicken breeds